Akshay Kolhar (born 5 May 1988) is an Indian first-class cricketer who plays for Vidarbha.

References

External links
 

1988 births
Living people
Indian cricketers
Vidarbha cricketers
People from Maharashtra